The Intensive Care Foundation is a charity dedicated to improving the care of critically ill patients by raising funds for vital clinical research as well as educating health professionals responsible for intensive care.

The Foundation's overall aim is to improve the number and quality of lives saved within an intensive care unit each year.

Research 

Intensive care teams rely on the latest research to ensure they can give the best life-saving treatment to their patients. To date, the Foundation has provided 52 grants to Australian and New Zealand research projects totaling more than $1.7 million since 1999. In 2007 almost a quarter of a million was granted.

Annual appeal 

Launched in 2000, the Intensive Care Appeal is a major fund-raising event held annually in Australia and New Zealand to create awareness and raise funds by selling wristbands and key tags – in 2008 a four-colored pen with a safety pull-apart lanyard will be introduced.

The theme for the 2008 Appeal is "Keep the Beat" with rock legend Jimmy Barnes being the face of the Appeal. The Appeal will run from 14 to 27 April, with Intensive Care Day taking place on Friday 18 April. Intensive Care Day gives ICUs across Australia and New Zealand the chance to celebrate the miracle of intensive care, the theme for the day is Keep the Beat – Rock On!

The Appeal merchandise is sold in ANZ branches throughout Australia, Souvlakihut stores in Victoria, Jesters Pie stores throughout New Zealand, and ICUs across Australia and New Zealand. The Foundation also has support from volunteers who help out with the Appeal every year.

Structure 

The Foundation aims to raise the awareness and profile of intensive care throughout the community, highlighting the miracle work that intensive care doctors, nurses, and researchers perform as a part of their everyday job.

The Intensive Care Foundation was formed by the Australian and New Zealand Intensive Care Society (ANZICS) in 1990.

A legally independent charity with tax-exempt status, the Foundation operates in both Australia and New Zealand.

The Intensive Care Foundation has a fully constituted Board of Trustees consisting of senior medical and corporate members; a Sydney and Melbourne Corporate Committee and an independent Scientific Committee. The Corporate Committee members volunteer their time to provide invaluable advice and support to events, business, and financial matters for the Foundation.

The Scientific Committee is headed by an Executive Team with representatives from the intensive care community. They are responsible for rigorously reviewing Research Grant Applications and advising the Board on the selection of research projects for funding.

Supporters 

The Intensive Care Foundation has several pharmaceutical and medical companies that support it financially. These companies understand the importance of the Foundation's mission - to fund life-saving research in intensive care. Their financial support covers the majority of administrative costs, which means that every public dollar donated goes towards Intensive Care Research.

Intensive Cooperative Members are: 
 AstraZeneca
 Covidien (formerly known as Tyco Healthcare)
 CSL Bioplasma
 Eli Lilly
 Fisher & Paykel Healthcare
 Glaxo Smith Kline
 Mayo Healthcare
 Merck Sharp & Dohme
 Philips
 Wyeth
 Edwards Lifesciences
 Pharmatel Fresenius Kabi

References

Health charities in Australia
Medical and health organisations based in Australia
Foundations based in Australia
Intensive care organizations